"Left to My Own Devices" is a song by English synth-pop duo Pet Shop Boys, released in November 1988 as the second single from their third studio album, Introspective (1988). It was also the first track of the album. The song fared better than the album's lead single, "Domino Dancing", charting three positions higher on the UK Singles Chart, at number four. It became the first track that Pet Shop Boys recorded with an orchestra, arranged by Richard Niles. Since its release, it has become a staple of Pet Shop Boys live performances.

Background and writing
Lyricist Neil Tennant explained the meaning of the track:

As with the other tracks on Introspective, it has a longer version on the album and was edited down to become more radio-friendly when released as a single. This is mainly due to the Pet Shop Boys wanting to be different from every other artist at the time. This is confirmed in the booklet accompanying the 2001 re-release of Introspective, where both Tennant and Lowe state:

Critical reception
Miranda Sawyer from Smash Hits named "Left to My Own Devices" Single of the Fortnight, writing, "Pop perfection from the winsome twosome. Complete with swank orchestra, this massive stomper galumphs away at a breakneck pace into all sorts of dramatic twists and turns, over which Neil's deadpan vocals sound brilliantly menacing. [...] A storming chorus plus! — plus! — one of those superbly pretentious talking bits Neil does, rounded off with a breathtaking violin swoosh, must ensure that this soars to the top of the charts and stays there for weeks and weeks. A truly awe-inspiring Single of the Fortnight."

Music video
The accompanying music video for "Left to My Own Devices", directed by longtime Pet Shop Boys director, Eric Watson, primarily consists of Tennant and Lowe dancing on an invisible glass floor, with the camera angle facing upwards. Tennant and Lowe are joined by several acrobats who are also seen from the same camera angle. At one point, balloons are also visible. MTV declined to show the video due to its dimly-lit nature.

Track listings

Charts

Weekly charts

Year-end charts

Other countries
Turkey's longest weekly video-music programme Pop Saati (lit. Pop Hour) begins with the intro of the song, which continues from 1987 until today on TRT.

References

1988 singles
1988 songs
Parlophone singles
Pet Shop Boys songs
Song recordings produced by Stephen Lipson
Song recordings produced by Trevor Horn
Songs written by Chris Lowe
Songs written by Neil Tennant